Mirza Mohammad Taher Vahid Qazvini (died 1700), was a Persian bureaucrat, poet, and historian, who served as the grand vizier of two Safavid monarchs, Shah Suleiman and the latter's son Soltan Hoseyn from 1691 to 1699. 

He is also notable for writing the Abbas-nama, the principal Iranian source regarding the events during the reign of Shah Abbas II.

Background 
A native of Qazvin, Taher Vahid was born around 1621. He was of Tajik (Persian) Sayyid ancestry, and belonged to a family that was notable for occupying the office of vaqa'i-nevis (court registar). His father Mirza Mohammad had occupied the office under Shah Abbas I, and Taher Vahid would also later occupy it.

Career 
Taher Vahid served as a chronicler during the reign of Shah Abbas II, composing the Abbas-nama, the principal Iranian source regarding the events during the reign of Shah Abbas II.

In March 1691, Shah Suleiman appointed Taher Vahid as his vizier, following a one year and a half vacancy of the office. The previous grand vizier had been Shaykh Ali Khan Zanganeh. After Taher Vahid's appointment, Shah Suleiman asked his opinion on the most pressing matters of the country, which Taher Vahid replied to by mentioning four serious problems that needed attention: the pay of the army of Iran, fiscal reform, unoccupied offices, and the renewal of trade. Shah Suleiman responded by increasing Taher Vahid's administrative authority to a unmatched level.

Taher Vahid continued to serve as vizier under Shah Suleiman's son and successor, Soltan Hoseyn. Taher Vahid, as well to a lesser degree the court steward (nazer) Najafqoli Khan, were the main counselors of Soltan Hoseyn during his early reign. In May 1699, Soltan Hoseyn dismissed Taher Vahid, supposedly due to the latters old age. He replaced him with the eshik-aqasi-bashi Mohammad Mo'men Khan Shamlu, who, however, was also advanced in age.

Taher Vahid died in 1700.

Poetry 
Taher Vahid was also a poet, composing 35,000 verses in various genres. He also known to have sent poems to the Mughal Empire, although they have not been published yet. Based on Taher Vahid's writings, the modern historian Sunil Sharma comments that "it is evident that his role in the intellectual and literary life of seventeenth-century Persianate circles was not at all insignificant." Hamid Dabashi lists Taher Vahid amongst some of the leading Iranian poets of the Indian style who had never visited India, along with Shafi'i Mashhadi, Asir-e Esfahani and Shaukat Bukhari. Taher Vahid is also known to have composed poetry in Azeri Turkish.

Notes

References

Sources 
 
 
 
 
 
 
 
 
 
 

Grand viziers of the Safavid Empire
17th-century Iranian politicians
1620s births
1700 deaths
People from Qazvin
17th-century Persian-language poets
Turkish poets
17th-century people of Safavid Iran